In architectural style, Bildts farmhouses are farmhouses where the main dwelling is placed at a right angle to the barn. The reason for this is unknown, yet these types of designs are common in many parts of The Netherlands.

Description
This farmhouse is commonly confused with the Frisian farmhouse, also known as the Head-Neck-Body Farmhouse, which consists of a main dwelling and a barn positioned vertically, directly behind it.

In Bildts farmhouses, however, the main dwelling has a barn either to the left or right of it, and the front of the barn is at a right angle to the main dwelling. Therefore, both the doors of the house face the same way.

See also
List of architectural styles
Timeline of architectural styles

References

House types
Agricultural buildings in the Netherlands
Vernacular architecture